Peter Krešimir IV, called the Great was King of Dalmatia and Croatia from 1059 until his death in 1074 or 1075. He was the last great ruler of the Krešimirović branch of the Trpimirović dynasty.

Under Peter Krešimir IV, the Croatian realm reached its peak territorially, earning him the sobriquet "the Great", otherwise unique in Croatian history. He kept his seat at Nin and Biograd na Moru; however, the city of Šibenik holds a statue of him and is sometimes called "Krešimir's city" (Croatian: "Krešimirov grad") because he is generally credited as the founder.

Biography

Early years
Peter Krešimir was born as one of two children to king Stephen I (Stjepan I) and his wife Hicela, daughter of the Venetian Doge Pietro II Orseolo.

Krešimir succeeded his father Stephen I upon his death in 1058 and was crowned the next year. It is not known where his coronation took place, but some historians suggest Biograd as a possibility.

From the outset, he continued the policies of his father, but was immediately requested in letter by Pope Nicholas II first in 1059 and then in 1060 to reform the Croatian church in accordance with the Roman rite. This was especially significant to the papacy in the aftermath of the Great Schism of 1054, when a papal ally in the Balkans was a necessity. Upon a visit of the papal legate Mainardius in 1060, Kresimir and the upper nobility lent their support to the pope and the church of Rome.

The lower nobility and the peasantry, however, were far less well-disposed to reforms. The Croatian priesthood was aligned towards Byzantine orientalism, including having long beards and marrying. More so, the ecclesiastical service was likely practiced in the native Slavonic (Glagolitic), whereas the pope demanded practice in Latin. This caused a rebellion of the clergy led by a certain priest named Vuk (Ulfus), who was referenced as newcomer to the kingdom in sources. Vuk had presented the demands and gifts of the Croats to the Pope during his stay in Rome, but was told nothing could be accomplished without the consent of the Split see and the king. They protested against celibacy and the Roman Rite in 1063, but they were proclaimed heretical at a synod of 1064 and excommunicated, a decision which Krešimir supported. Krešimir harshly quelled all opposition and sustained a firm alignment towards western Romanism, with the intent of more fully integrating the Dalmatian populace into his realm. In turn, he could then use them to balance the power caused by the growing feudal class. By the end of Krešimir's reign, feudalism had made permanent inroads into Croatian society and Dalmatia had been permanently associated with the Croatian state.

The income from the cities further strengthened Krešimir's power, and he subsequently fostered the development of more cities, such as Biograd, Nin, Šibenik, Karin, and Skradin. He also had several monasteries constructed, like the Benedictine monasteries of St John the Evangelist (1060) and St Thomas (c. 1066) in Biograd, and donated much land to the Church. In 1066, he granted a charter to the new monastery of St. Mary in Zadar, where the founder and first nun was his cousin, the Abbess  Čika. This remains the oldest Croatian monument in the city of Zadar, and became a spearhead for the reform movement. During the same year, he gave his nephew Stephen Trpimirović the office of Duke of Croatia, which designated him as his co-ruler and successor.

In 1067, the northern part of the kingdom was invaded by Ulric I, Margrave of Carniola, who occupied a part of Kvarner and the eastern coast of Istria, the "March of Dalmatia". As the king was at that time preoccupied with the liturgical issues and reforms in Dalmatia, these parts were eventually liberated by his ban Demetrius Zvonimir.

Territorial policy

It was during his rule that, for the first time, the high-ranking office of ban started to branch, as multiple bans were first mentioned in 1067. It is known that, apart from the ban of Croatia, the banate of Slavonia existed during this period, which was at this time likely held by Krešimir's successor Demetrius Zvonimir. The city of Šibenik is for the first time mentioned during his rule in 1066, which was his seat for some time and is for these reasons referred to as "Krešimir's city" in modern times.

In 1069, he gave the island of Maun, near Nin, to the monastery of St. Krševan in Zadar, in thanks for the "expansion of the kingdom on land and on sea, by the grace of the omnipotent God" (quia Deus omnipotens terra marique nostrum prolungavit regnum). In his surviving document, Krešimir nevertheless did not fail to point out that it was "our own island that lies on our Dalmatian sea" (nostram propriam insulam in nostro Dalmatico mari sitam, que vocatur Mauni).

Around 1070, Krešimir was rumored to have murdered his brother Gojslav, who had served as the ban of Croatia until 1070. Eventually, when the rumors reached abroad, Pope Alexander II sent one of his legates to inquire about the death of Gojslav. Only after the monarch and 12 Croatian župans had taken an oath that he did not kill his brother, the Pope symbolically restored the royal power to Krešimir. Krešimir in turn made Dmitar Zvonimir the new Ban of Croatia, and subsequently elevated him as his principal adviser with the title Duke of Croatia.

Relations with Byzantium and the Normans
In 1069, he had the Byzantine Empire recognize him as supreme ruler of the parts of Dalmatia Byzantium had controlled since the Croatian dynastic struggle of 997. At the time, the empire was at war both with the Seljuk Turks in Asia and the Normans in southern Italy, so Krešimir took the opportunity and, avoiding an imperial nomination as proconsul or eparch, consolidated his holdings as the regnum Dalmatiae et Chroatia. This was not a formal title, but it designated a unified political-administrative territory, which had been the chief desire of the Croatian kings.

During Krešimir's reign, the Normans from southern Italy  first became involved in Balkan politics and Krešimir soon came in contact with them. After the 1071 Battle of Manzikert, where the Seljuk Turks routed the Eastern Imperial army, the Diocleans, Serbs and other Slavs instigated a rebellion of boyars in Macedonia and in 1072, Krešimir is alleged to have lent his aid to this uprising. In 1075, the Normans under Peter II of Trani invaded the Dalmatian possessions of Croatia from southern Italy, most likely at the command of the Pope, who had been quarreling with Krešimir. During the invasion, the Norman count Amico of Giovinazzo besieged the island of Rab for almost a month (14 April to early May). The siege failed, but he managed to take the island of Cres on 9 May. It was during these clashes that the Croatian king himself was captured by Amico at an unidentified location. In return for liberation, he was forced to relinquish many cities, including both his capitals, as well as Zadar, Split, and Trogir. His followers, such as the Bishop of Cres, also gathered a large ransom, but failed to secure his release. Over the next two years, the Republic of Venice expelled the Normans and assumed control of the cities for themselves.

Death and succession
Near the end of his reign, having no sons, Peter Krešimir designated Demetrius Zvonimir as his heir. It is uncertain whether Peter died in a Norman prison during the first half of 1075. According to Johannes Lucius, a usurper, Slavac, succeeded to the throne sometime in 1074 and reigned for only a year before Zvonimir succeeded.<ref name="sisic2">Ferdo Šišić, Povijest Hrvata u vrijeme narodnih vladara;;, 1925, Zagreb </ref>

Krešimir was buried in the church of St. Stephen in Solin, together with the other dukes and kings of Croatia. Several centuries later the Ottoman Turks destroyed the church, banished the monks who had preserved it, and destroyed the graves.

Legacy

Krešimir is, by some historians, regarded as one of the greatest Croatian rulers. Thomas the Archdeacon named him "the Great" in his work Historia Salonitana'' during the 13th century for his significance in unifying the Dalmatian coastal cities with the Croatian state and accomplishing a peak in Croatia's territorial extent. The RTOP-11 of the Croatian navy was named after Krešimir. The city of Šibenik holds a statue of him and some schools in the vicinity are named after Krešimir.

Notes

Literature
Ferdo Šišić, Povijest Hrvata u vrijeme narodnih vladara, 1925, Zagreb

External links

  Povijest Hrvatske I. (R. Horvat)/Petar Krešimir
 A romantic portrait of Kresimir.
 Map of Kingdom of Croatia during Kresimir IV.

Trpimirović dynasty
Kings of Croatia
Medieval Croatian nobility
1074 deaths
11th-century monarchs in Europe
Roman Catholic monarchs
Year of birth unknown
11th-century Croatian people
Burials at the Church of St. Stephen, Solin